Pogonotriccus is a genus of small passerine birds in the family Tyrannidae. They are found in wooded habitats of Central and South America.

The genus was erected by the German ornithologists Jean Cabanis and Ferdinand Heine in 1859 with the southern bristle tyrant (Pogonotriccus eximius) as the type species. The genus has usually been merged into the genus Phylloscartes. In 2004 John Fitzpatrick in the Handbook of the Birds of the World chose to treat Pogonotriccus as a separate genus based on the slight differences in behaviour of the birds in the two genera. Frank Gill and David Donsker then also recognised Pogonotriccus in the list of bird species that they maintain on behalf of the International Ornithological Committee. The evidence for splitting the genus is weak: a 2009 molecular phylogenetic study that included one species from Pogonotriccus and three from Phylloscartes, found that the genetic differences were small.

Species
The genus contains seven species:

References

 
Bird genera